Callibaetis californicus is a species of small minnow mayfly in the family Baetidae. It is found in Central America, North America. In North America its range includes all of Mexico, and the western United States.

References

Mayflies
Articles created by Qbugbot
Insects described in 1900